The Hollywood Fringe Festival is an annual fringe theatre festival in Hollywood, California. Most indoor venues for the festival are in and around Hollywood Theatre Row, a  stretch of Santa Monica Boulevard in Los Angeles.

Founder Ben Hill started trying to organize a local fringe festival not long after he moved to Los Angeles from Iowa City in 2007. He and other organizers launched the first Hollywood Fringe Festival in the summer of 2010. That year, there were 130 shows in the festival.

The shows are not curated (selected based on merit). To perform, one must pay a registration fee and be ready with a concept and the means to produce it. The festival organizers market the event and provide some support, but the theatre companies must find their own venues and market their own shows.

In the 2012 festival, theatre companies produced more than 230 shows and gave more than 1,000 performances. Companies participating in the 2014 festival produced more than 300 shows.

In 2018, the Hollywood Fringe Festival was one of the filming locations for the trivia game show Buzz'd Out!.

Approximately 56,000 tickets sold were sold for the 2016 festival, which drew an estimated $447,000 in revenue. All revenue from ticket sales is paid to the artists and venues.

The COVID-19 pandemic caused 2020's cancellation & deferral to 2021.

See also
 San Diego International Fringe Festival

References

External links
 
 
 

21st-century theatre
Festivals in Los Angeles
Fringe festivals in the United States
Theatre in Los Angeles
Festivals established in 2010
2010 establishments in California
Arts festivals in California